Shagano-Kondakovka is a rural locality (a selo) in Kozlovsky Selsoviet of Volodarsky District, Astrakhan Oblast, Russia. The population was 316 as of 2010. There are 3 streets.

Geography 
Shagano-Kondakovka is located on the Buzan River, 8 km north of Volodarsky (the district's administrative centre) by road. Kozlovo is the nearest rural locality.

References 

Rural localities in Volodarsky District, Astrakhan Oblast